Get Yourself a College Girl, also released as The Swingin' Set, is a 1964 Metrocolor film comedy in the style of a beach party movie. The plot involves a college co-ed who tries to balance her time writing songs and dealing with her publisher who tries to pursue her. It was directed by Sidney Miller and written by Robert E. Kent, and filmed at Sun Valley, Idaho, United States.

Plot
Terry Taylor (Mary Ann Mobley) is a senior at conservative Wyndham College for Women (fictitious), and under an assumed name, a successful pop songwriter. After her publisher Gary Underwood (Chad Everett) unknowingly exposes her career, Wyndham's board of trustees—including the college founder's grandson, California State Senator Hubert Morrison (Willard Waterman)—condemns Terry for indecent behavior.

To distract herself from a possible expulsion, Terry, her friends Sue Ann Mobley (Chris Noel) and Lynne (Nancy Sinatra), and their physical-education instructor Marge Endicott (Joan O'Brien) travel to Sun Valley, Idaho, for a Christmas-break ski vacation. There, they meet Gary and his artist friend Armand (Fabrizio Mioni); Senator Morrison, who wants to solicit the youth vote; and Lynne's husband.

The Dave Clark Five, The Animals, and other musical acts perform in the background as Gary and Armand romance Terry and Sue Ann, respectively, while Lynne and her husband spend the entire vacation in their room. Senator Morrison courts Marge and shows that he is a talented dancer, but an embarrassing newspaper photograph threatens his re-election. The others demonstrate his support among the young by holding a successful telephone poll with musical performances.

Cast
 Mary Ann Mobley as Teresa 'Terry' Taylor
 Joan O'Brien as teacher Miss Marge Endicott
 Nancy Sinatra as Lynne
 Chris Noel as Sue Ann Mobley
 Chad Everett as Gary Underwood
 Willard Waterman as Senator Hubert Morrison
 Fabrizio Mioni as Armand
 James Millhollin as Gordon
 Paul Todd as Ray
 Donnie Brooks as Donnie
 Hortense Petra as Donna, the Photographer
 Dorothy Neumann as Miss Martha Stone, Dean of Wyndham College
 Marti Barris as Secretary
 Mario Costello as Bellboy
 Percy Helton as Senator's chauffeur
 The Standells as Themselves
 The Dave Clark Five as Themselves
 Stan Getz as himself
 Astrud Gilberto as herself
 Roberta Linn as herself
 The Bellboys as Themselves
 The Animals as Themselves
 The Rhythm Masters as Themselves
 The Jimmy Smith Trio as Themselves

Production
The film was known as Watusi A Go-Go, The Swingin' Set and The Go Go Set.

Music
 Sidney Miller and Fred Karger wrote two songs for the film, “The Swingin’ Set,” performed offscreen by Donnie Brooks at the film’s opening, and “Get Yourself a College Girl,” performed in the film by Mary Ann Mobley.
 Stan Getz with the Stan Getz Quartet back Astrud Gilberto as she performs “The Girl from Ipanema.”
 The Rhythm Masters perform “Beat Street Rag.”
 Jimmy Smith with The Jimmy Smith Trio perform “Comin' Home Johnny” and the instrumental "The Sermon."
 Freddie Bell & Roberta Linn with the Bellboys perform “Talkin' About Love.”
 The Standells perform “Bony Maronie” and “The Swim.”
 The Dave Clark Five perform “Whenever You're Around,” and “Thinking of You Baby."
 The Animals sing “Blue Feeling” and “Around and Around.”
 Singer Nancy Sinatra, who would have a hit record two years later, appears in this film but does not sing.

Reception
The Los Angeles Times called it "inoffensively silly".

See also
 List of American films of 1964

References

External links
 
 
 
 

1964 films
1964 comedy films
Beach party films
American comedy films
Metro-Goldwyn-Mayer films
American skiing films
Films set in universities and colleges
1960s English-language films
1960s American films